The 411th Support Brigade is a support brigade of the United States Army.

External links
411th Support Brigade at the Institute of Heraldry

Support 411